Amy Borkowsky is an American author and comedian. Based in New York City, she is known for the two-volume comedy CDs Amy's Answering Machine: Messages from Mom, collections of actual messages from her overprotective mother. The CDs were launched in an interview with Matt Lauer on Today in 2000.

Coverage
Media coverage for Amy's Answering Machine includes airplay on hundreds of radio stations and on National Public Radio. Amy performs her comedy act and speaks at a variety of events across the United States. She is also the author of the Amy's Answering Machine book.

Projects
Amy is also the creator of the Cellibacy project, a media event in which she gave up her cell phone for sixty days, and she is the author of Statements: True Tales of Life, Love, and Credit Card Bills, a collection of true stories she remembered when she looked back at the charges on ten years of American Express credit card bills. "Every purchase tells a story".

References

External links
 NPR broadcast

American women comedians
Living people
Writers from New York City
Comedians from New York City
Year of birth missing (living people)
21st-century American women